Garwick Glen Halt (Manx: Stadd Ghlion Garwick) is a rural intermediate request stop on the east coast route of the Manx Electric Railway on the Isle of Man.

Location
The station lies between Douglas and Laxey and is situated in a small valley of the same name which opens into Garwick Bay.  The place name derives from the Manx Gaelic meaning "pleasant bay" derived from an old Celtic word.

History
The station was once one of the busiest on the whole railway being home to the sprawling pleasure gardens of the same name which operated successfully until the close of the 1965 summer season at which time the station fell into private ownership.  The station itself once boasted its own station master and covered waiting shelter for passengers as well as a rustic souvenir stand similar to those still found at Laxey Station today.  The glen, with its topiaries and well kept gardens led down to the beach where the shoreline caves were marketed in contemporary literature for the station.  At the turn of the 20th century the area was marketed as featuring "smugglers' cove", "hermit's archway" and many other romantic names and the site was dominated by the hotel of the same name (now a private dwelling and not available for public viewing).  There is also a large lake in the grounds, which are home to the island's only maze.

Decline
Despite closure the station remained open as seldom used, and the structures were not demolished until 1978 at which time the site was cleared.  There remains in situ a crossover set of points to facilitate short workings to and from Derby Castle but this has not been used for many years.  From the passing tram a solitary overgrown section of brick wall is the only reminder of this once-busy station.  The glen and its grounds have been open to the public on several special open days in recent times but such occasions have now ceased.

Route

See also
Manx Electric Railway Stations

References

Sources
 Manx Manx Electric Railway Stopping Places (2002) Manx Electric Railway Society
 Island Island Images: Manx Electric Railway Pages (2003) Jon Wornham
 Official Official Tourist Department Page (2009) Isle Of Man Heritage Railways

Railway stations in the Isle of Man
Manx Electric Railway
Railway stations opened in 1894
Railway stations closed in 1965